Waitin' on the Wonderful is the second studio album by Canadian country music singer Aaron Lines. The album was nominated for Country Recording of the Year at the 2006 Juno Awards. "Lights of My Hometown," one of the singles released from the CD, was the most played song on Canadian country radio in 2006. The title track was also a Top 40 country hit in the U.S., although the album was not released in the U.S. "It Takes a Man" was later recorded by Chris Young on his 2009 album, The Man I Want to Be.

Track listing

2005 albums
Aaron Lines albums
Albums produced by Chris Lindsey